HMS Blencathra (L24) was a  destroyer of the Royal Navy in commission from 1940 to 1948. She was a member of the first subgroup of the class, and saw service through most of World War II.

Construction and commissioning
Blencathra was ordered under the 1939 War Emergency Build Programme from Cammell Laird, Birkenhead, on 4 September 1939. She was laid down as Job Number V1048 on 11 or 18 November 1939 and launched on 6 August 1940. She was completed on 14 December 1940 and immediately commissioned, under the command of Commander Hugh Waters Shelley Browning, RN.

Service history

Home waters, 1941-1943
Upon commissioning, Blencathra immediately began acceptance trials, followed by work-ups. With these completed, she reported for duty in January 1941 with the 1st Destroyer Flotilla, based at Portsmouth, to perform patrol and convoy defence duty in the English Channel. On 12 May 1941, she joined her sister ship  in escorting the heavy cruiser  from Portsmouth to Rosyth, Scotland, where Berwick was to complete repairs, then returned to her routine duties. In March 1942, she was "adopted" by the community of Keswick, then in Cumberland, as the result of a successful Warship Week national savings campaign. On 14 March 1942, she took part in an unsuccessful attempt to intercept the German merchant raider  before Michel could break out into the North Atlantic Ocean, and suffered damage when Michel fired on her. On 18 June 1942, German aircraft damaged her with cannon fire and near misses by bombs when the convoy she was escorting in the English Channel came under air attack.

While she was escorting Convoy FS 1074 on 28 March 1943 German E-boats attacked, but the destroyer  drove them off.

Mediterranean, 1943
In May 1943, the Royal Navy selected Blencathra for participation in Operation Husky, the Allied invasion of Sicily planned for July 1943, and she began preparations for foreign service.

While at Gibraltar in early July 1943, Blencathra was transferred to the 58th Destroyer Division of the Mediterranean Fleet, assigned to escort military convoys to Sicily for the amphibious landings there. After pre-invasion exercises, she escorted assault convoys on 9 July 1943 and, after they arrived at the invasion beaches on 10 July 1943, the first day of the invasion, was assigned to defense of the beachhead and of later convoys bringing in reinforcements and supplies.

In August 1943, Blencathra and the rest of the 58th Destroyer Division was based at Malta and assigned to patrol and escort duty in the central Mediterranean Sea. During the month, she was selected to participate in Operation Avalanche, the Allied landings at Salerno on the mainland of Italy planned for September 1943. On 9 September 1943, she took part in the initial Salerno landings, then protected the beachhead and convoys bringing in reinforcements and supplies.

Released from Operation Avalanche in October 1943, Blencathra next operated in the Aegean Sea to assist in the unsuccessful Allied attempt to defend Italian-held islands there against invasion by German forces during the Dodecanese Campaign, sheltering in neutral Turkish waters at night to avoid German air attack. On 8 October 1943 she conducted a search for German craft carrying troops to the islands, and on 27 October 1943 she joined her sister ship  and the destroyer  in escorting the light cruiser  as the cruiser deployed to the Aegean Sea to relieve the light cruiser  on interception duty there. On 9 November 1943, Blencathra conducted an interception patrol off Amorgas in company with her sister ship Exmoor and the destroyer . On 13 November 1943 she sortied from Alexandria, Egypt, to support Allied military operations ashore on the Aegean islands and on 14 November 1943 she joined her sister ship  and the destroyer  in bombarding German positions at Alinda Bay on Leros. On 19 November 1943 she towed her sister ship , which had suffered damage when hit by a German glide bomb, from Turkish waters to Alexandria.

After the Dodecanese Campaign ended in an Allied defeat, Blencathra and the rest of the 58th Destroyer Division were based at Alexandria in December 1943 for patrol and escort duties in the Eastern Mediterranean.

Mediterranean, 1944

In January 1944, the 58th Destroyer Division was transferred to Malta, where it conducted patrols and escorted convoys in the central Mediterranean, including the protection of shipping supporting Operation Shingle, the Allied invasion at Anzio and Nettuno, Italy.

On 9 March 1944, the 58th Destroyer Division deployed for antisubmarine operations in support of Shingle, and on 10 March 1944 Blencathra joined her sister ships Blankney, Brecon, and Exmoor, the destroyer , and the United States Navy destroyer  in a depth-charge attack in the Tyrrhenian Sea south of Ostia, Italy, that forced the German submarine  to the surface. U-450 scuttled herself at position , and Urchin rescued her entire crew.

They attacked U-223 with depth charges until Laforey ordered them to halt, then continued to track U-223 for several hours until she was forced to surface in the early hours of 30 March 1944 after 27 hours of attack by depth charges and Hedgehog antisubmarine mortars. Blencathra joined the other ships in illuminating U-223 with searchlights and sinking her with gunfire at position  with the loss of 23 of the submarines crew, leaving 27 survivors, but not before U-223 sank Laforey with an acoustic torpedo with the loss of 182 lives, leaving 69 survivors.

In April 1944, the Royal Navy selected Blencathra, Hambledon, and Mendip to participate in Operation Neptune, the initial assault phase of the Allied invasion of Normandy scheduled for early June 1944. Accordingly, Hambledon departed the Mediterranean that month and proceeded to the United Kingdom.

Home waters, 1944-1945

In May 1944, Blencathra was assigned to the 21st Destroyer Flotilla at Sheerness and began exercises to prepare for the Normandy invasion. Blencathra then steamed to Plymouth and, based there with Hambledon and Mendip, defended convoys carrying reinforcements and supplies to the Normandy beachheads until released from such duties on 30 June 1944.

After the termination of Operation Neptune, Blencathra remained in the English Channel to patrol, protect convoys, and support military operations in France through August 1944. On 3 August 1944 she suffered damage when she attempted to salvage a captured German human torpedo and its scuttling charge detonated.

In September 1944, the Royal Navy assigned Blencathra to the 21st Destroyer Flotilla at Sheerness for patrol and convoy defence operations in the North Sea under the control of the Nore Command, and she continued these operations until Germany surrendered in early May 1945. After that, she operated in support of re-occupation forces and visited ports in the United Kingdom and on the European continent until 15 August 1945, when she suffered damage in a collision with the merchant ship . After repairs and the removal of her armament and other modifications at the dockyard at Rosyth, Blencathra reentered service in October 1945 as a target ship in the North Sea for the training of aircrews in the identification and targeting of ships. Withdrawn from this duty in June 1948, she was decommissioned and placed in reserve in July 1948.

Reserve and disposal

Blencathra was placed in reserve in the Harwich Division of the Reserve Fleet in 1948. In April 1950, it was proposed that the United Kingdom sell her to Norway, but the sale never occurred. In 1953 she was transferred to the Reserve Fleets Barrow-in-Furness Division. She was among ten Hunt-class escort destroyers placed on the disposal list in October 1956 and was sold to the British Iron & Steel Corporation (BISCO) for scrapping before the end of the year. BISCO allocated her to Thos. W. Ward to be broken up. Taken under tow, she arrived at Wards yard on 2 January 1957 and was scrapped.

References

External links
 Naval History: HMS BLENCATHRA (L 24) -  Type I, Hunt-class Escort Destroyer
 uboat.net HMS Blencathra (L 24)

 

Hunt-class destroyers of the Royal Navy
Ships built on the River Mersey
1940 ships
World War II destroyers of the United Kingdom
Maritime incidents in August 1945
Naval ships of Operation Neptune
Royal Navy ship names